John, Hermit of Pskov (died 1616) lived in a period of terrible suffering and war between the Russian, Polish, and Swedish governments at the turn of the 16th to 17th centuries.
He is credited with the gift of powerful intercession with God under the care of the saints and Mother of God of the Pskov Caves.
St John... "lived within the city walls for 23 years; his fish was rancid and he did not eat bread. He lived within the city as though in a wilderness, in great silence," and he died on October 24, 1616.
John the Hermit of Pskov is commemorated on 24 October in the Eastern Orthodox Church.

See also

Christian monasticism
Poustinia
Jan Tyranowski, lay hermit of Poland

References
Orthodox Church in America

Year of birth missing
1616 deaths
Russian hermits
Russian saints of the Eastern Orthodox Church
Russian Orthodox monks
17th-century Christian saints
17th-century Russian people
People from Pskov
17th-century Christian monks
Tsardom of Russia people